The Field of Blood is a Scottish crime drama television series, broadcast between 8 May 2011 and 9 August 2013, adapting the novels of Denise Mina. Jayd Johnson stars as the protagonist, Paddy Meehan.

Plot
The first series of The Field of Blood adapts the novel of the same name, which is set in 1982. This series comprised two episodes, broadcast on BBC One on 8 and 9 May 2011, respectively. The second series adapts the follow-up novel, The Dead Hour, which is set later in the same decade. The second series was commissioned by the BBC in 2012, again containing two episodes, which aired on 8 and 9 August 2013, respectively. Set in Glasgow, Scotland, in 1982, a young female reporter sees an opportunity for a riveting story for her slowly dying city newspaper when a young boy is kidnapped from a Glasgow park and later is found murdered. She sees connections to a year-old prior murder with similar characteristics that nobody else wants to see and she is determined to and connect them and convince the police.

Reception
Time Out gave the second series four out of five stars and said "It’s good to see this grubby Glaswegian crime drama get another run – it slipped under the radar somewhat when it first appeared in 2011." Sarah Hughes of The Independent said "While the television version of The Field of Blood lacks the sense of human fraility of the Denise Mina books on which it's based, occasionally seeming clunky in comparison, its great strength lies in the accurate portrayal of a distant, darker time." Sarah Rainey of The Daily Telegraph also gave it four out of five stars and said "The opening half was bleak but authentic, from the clack-clack of the Olympia typewriters to the obligatory Irn Bru advert. ... The camerawork was clever – just the right amount of jumpy hand-held shots and haunting close-ups – and the dialogue was witty."

Sarah Hughes, also writing for The Guardian, called the first series "impressive" and said it was "a cut above the usual summer schedule-filling fare." Lucy Mangan, another journalist for The Guardian said "this potent brew of corruption, conflict and car coats is nevertheless a waste of David Morrissey's talents" when talking about the second series.

Cast

Main cast
 Jayd Johnson as Paddy Meehan
 Matt Costello as Con Meehan
 Bronagh Gallagher as Trisha Meehan
 Ford Kiernan as George McVie
 Kelsey Griffin as Mary Ann Meehan
 David Morrissey as Murray Devlin
 Brian Pettifer as Father Richards

Recurring cast

Series 1
 Derek Riddell as D.S. Mickey Patterson
 William Ruane as D.C. Colin McGovern
 Jonas Armstrong as Terry Hewitt
 Peter Capaldi as Pete Walker
 Stephen McCole as Danny Ogilvey
 Gavin Mitchell as Henry Naismith
 Andrew Sloey as Daily News Journalist

Series 2
 Ron Donachie as D.C.I Thomas Sullivan
 Michael Nardone as D.I. Michael Gallagher
 Stuart Martin as D.C. Dan Burns
 David Hayman as Red Willie McDade
 Amy Manson as Karen Burnett
 Katherine Kelly as Maloney
 Andrew Sloey as Daily News Journalist

Episode list

Series 1 (2011)

Series 2 (2013)

DVD
The first series was released on DVD on 5 September 2011. A box set of both series was released in the United States on 30 September 2014.

References

External links
 
 
 

British crime television series
BBC television dramas
2011 British television series debuts
2013 British television series endings
2010s British drama television series
Television shows set in Scotland
English-language television shows
2010s Scottish television series